A dead man's switch is a device used as a fail-safe.

Dead man's switch may also refer to:

 Dead Man's Switch (audio drama), based on the British television series Doctor Who
 "Dead Man's Switch" (The Outer Limits), an episode of The Outer Limits
 "Deadman Switch", an episode of Stargate SG-1

See also
 Dead Hand (disambiguation)
 Dead Man (disambiguation)